Curry pie is a variety of savoury pie served in the United Kingdom. It is made from curry gravy, usually containing an assortment of fillings and enclosed in a pastry shell. Curry pies are a popular pub meal in the United Kingdom, often accompanied by chips.

Ingredients
In Australia and New Zealand, as well as serving pies made with an Indian curry filling, a variety of curry pie with Thai curry filling is also popular, often made with either red, green or yellow curry.

See also
 List of pies, tarts and flans
 Curry beef turnover
 Curry puff
 Curry bread

References

British pies
British cuisine
Australian pies
New Zealand pies
Indian cuisine in the United Kingdom
Savoury pies